

Surname
Smith-Dorrien is a surname. Notable people with the surname include:

Horace Lockwood Smith-Dorrien (1858–1930), British Army General
Olive Smith-Dorrien (1881–1951), philanthropist and wife of Horace Smith-Dorrien
Thomas Smith-Dorrien-Smith (1846–1918), Lord Proprietor of the Isles of Scilly 1872–1918
Arthur Dorrien-Smith (1876–1955), Lord Proprietor of the Isles of Scilly 1918–1920

Places
Smith-Dorrien House, a building in Aldershot, Hampshire, UK
Smith-Dorrien Trail, a road in Alberta, Canada